Carl Alstrup (11 April 1877 – 2 October 1942) was a Danish actor and film director. He appeared in 22 films between 1908 and 1942. He also directed four films between 1909 and 1910. He was born in Sundbyvester, Tårnby, Denmark and died in Snekkersten, Denmark.

Filmography

 Falkedrengen (1908)
 Når djævle er på spil (1909)
 Apachepigens hævn (1909)
 Faldgruben (1909)
 Skarpretterens Søn (1910)
 Fra storstadens dyb (1910)
 København ved Nat (1910)
 Bukseskørtet, jupe colotte (1911)
 Det gale pensionat (1911)
 Guvernørens datter (1912)
 Elskovsleg (1914)
 En opstandelse (1915)
 Skomakarprinsen (1920)
 Kärlek och hypnotism (1921)
 Lord Saviles brott (1922)
 The Golden Smile (1935)
 Den kloge Mand (1937)
 Genboerne (1939)
 Vagabonden (1940)
 En forbryder (1941)
 Peter Andersen (1941)
 Natekspressen P903 (1942)

Honours and awards

Foreign honours
 : Knight of the Order of the White Lion (1935)

References

External links
 
 
 

1877 births
1942 deaths
Danish film directors
Danish male film actors
Danish male silent film actors
20th-century Danish male actors
People from Tårnby Municipality
Knights of the Order of the White Lion